The gens Eppia was a plebeian family at Rome.  It is known chiefly from a single individual, Marcus Eppius, a Roman senator, who took an active part in favour of Pompeius on the breaking out of the Civil War in 49 BC.  He was one of the legates of Quintus Metellus Scipio in the African war, and was pardoned by Caesar, with many others of his party, after the Battle of Thapsus.  Afterwards he seems to have gone into Spain, and renewed the war under Sextus Pompeius, in 46 and 45.

Members
This list includes abbreviated praenomina. For an explanation of this practice, see filiation.

 Marcus Eppius, father of the partisan of Pompeius.
 Marcus Eppius M. f., a Roman senator, and partisan of Pompeius during the Civil War.  He served as legate under Quintus Metellus Scipio, and later under Sextus Pompeius.

See also
 List of Roman gentes

References

Roman gentes